"Don't Worry" is a song written and recorded by American country music artist Marty Robbins. It was released in February 1961 as the third single from his compilation album More Greatest Hits. The song was Robbins' seventh number one on the country chart and stayed at number one for ten weeks. The single crossed over to the pop chart and was one of Marty Robbins' most successful crossover songs, peaking at number three on the Hot 100.

Background
The track has an early example of guitar distortion. A faulty channel in the mixing desk at Nashville's Quonset Hut Studio unexpectedly transformed session musician Grady Martin's Danelectro six-string baritone guitar tone in the bridge section and brief reprise right at the end into an unusual distorted sound. Although Martin did not like the sound, Robbins' producer left the guitar track as it was. The effect was eventually reverse-engineered and developed into the Maestro FZ-1 Fuzz-Tone, one of the first guitar pedals, produced by Gibson under the Maestro brand name.

Chart performance

Cover versions
 The song was covered by Holly Dunn on her 1990 album, Heart Full of Love.
 The song was covered by LeAnn Rimes on her 1999 album, LeAnn Rimes.
 The song was covered by Jimmie Dale Gilmore on his 2005 album, Come on Back.

References

External links
 

1961 singles
1961 songs
Marty Robbins songs
Holly Dunn songs
LeAnn Rimes songs
Songs written by Marty Robbins
Columbia Records singles
Song recordings produced by Don Law